Irwell Riverside (ward) is an electoral ward of Salford, England.  The ward is bounded by meanders of the River Irwell and includes the main University of Salford campus.

It is represented in Westminster by Rebecca Long-Bailey MP for Salford and Eccles. A profile of the ward conducted by Salford City Council in 2014 recorded a population of 12,939.

Councillors 
The ward is represented by three councillors:

 Jane Hamilton (Lab)
 Ray Walker (Lab)
 Stephen Coen (Lab)

 indicates seat up for re-election.
 indicates seat won in by-election.

Elections in 2010s

May 2019

May 2018

May 2016

May 2015

May 2014

May 2012

May 2011

May 2010

Elections in 2000s

References 

Salford City Council Wards